Mangudadatu, officially the Municipality of Mangudadatu (Maguindanaon: Ingud nu Mangudadatu; Iranun: Inged a Mangudadatu), is a  municipality in the province of Maguindanao del Sur, Philippines. According to the 2020 census, it has a population of 26,203 people.

It was created out of 8 barangays of Buluan, by virtue of Muslim Mindanao Autonomy Act No. 204, which was subsequently ratified in a plebiscite held on December 30, 2006.

Geography

Barangays
Mangudadatu is politically subdivided into 8 barangays.
Daladagan
Kalian
Luayan 
Paitan
Panapan
Tenok
Tinambulan
Tumbao

Climate

Demographics

Economy

References

External links
 MMA Act No. 204 : An Act Creating the Municipality of Mangudadatu in the Province of Maguindanao
 Mangudadatu Profile at the DTI Cities and Municipalities Competitive Index
 Newly created provinces, municipalities, barangays, converted city Accessed on March 9, 2006.
 [ Philippine Standard Geographic Code]
 Philippine Census Information
 Local Governance Performance Management System

Municipalities of Maguindanao del Sur